The Peleopodinae are a subfamily of small moths in the family Depressariidae.

Taxonomy and systematics
Antoloea Meyrick, 1914
Carcina Hübner, [1825]
Durrantia Busck, 1908
Peleopoda Zeller, 1877
Pseuderotis Clarke, 1956

References

 
Depressariidae
Moth subfamilies